A number of military citadels are known to have been constructed underground in central London, dating mostly from the Second World War and the Cold War. Unlike traditional above-ground citadels, these sites are primarily secure centres for defence coordination.

A large network of tunnels exists below London for a variety of communications, civil defence and military purposes; however, it is unclear how these tunnels, and the various facilities linked to them, fit together, if at all. Even the number and nature of these facilities is unclear; only a few have been officially admitted to.

Pindar
The most important military citadel in central London is Pindar, or the Defence Crisis Management Centre. The bunker is deep beneath the Ministry of Defence on Whitehall. Construction took ten years and cost £126.3 million. Pindar became operational in 1992, two years before construction was complete. Computer equipment was much more expensive to install than originally estimated as there was very little physical access to the site.

Pindar's main function is to be a crisis management and communications centre, principally between the MOD headquarters and the actual centre of military operations, the Permanent Joint Headquarters in Northwood. It is reported to be connected to Downing Street and the Cabinet Office by a tunnel under Whitehall. Despite rumours, Armed Forces Minister Jeremy Hanley told the House of Commons on 29 April 1994 that "the facility is not connected to any transport system".

Although the facility is not open to the public, it has had some public exposure. In Fighting the War, a BBC documentary on the Iraq conflict broadcast in 2003, BBC cameras were allowed into the facility to film a small part of a teleconference between ministers and military commanders. Also, in 2008 the British photographer David Moore published his series of photographs The Last Things, widely believed to be an extensive photographic survey of Pindar. Photographs taken of the facility in 2008 show that it has stores including toothpaste, toothbrushes, and mouthwashes. It has bunks for up to 100 military officers, politicians and civilians as well as communication facilities, a medical centre and maps.

The name Pindar is taken from the ancient Greek poet, whose house alone was left standing after Thebes was razed in 335 BC.

Admiralty Citadel

The Admiralty Citadel, London's most visible military citadel, is located just behind the Admiralty building on Horse Guards Parade. It is also linked by tunnels to government buildings in Whitehall.

Sir Winston Churchill described it in his memoirs as a "vast monstrosity which weighs upon the Horse Guards Parade" – and Boston ivy has been encouraged to cover it in an apparent attempt to soften its harsh appearance. Its brutal functionality speaks of a very practical purpose; in the event of a German invasion, it was intended that the building would become a fortress, with loopholed firing positions provided to fend off attackers.

In 1992 the Admiralty communications centre was established here as the stone frigate HMS St Vincent, which became MARCOMM COMCEN (St Vincent) in 1998. The Admiralty Citadel is still used today by the Ministry of Defence.

Cabinet War Rooms

The only central London citadel currently open to the public is the Cabinet War Rooms, located in Horse Guards Road in the basement of what is now HM Treasury. This was not a purpose-built citadel but was instead a reinforced adaptation of an existing basement built many years before.

The War Rooms were constructed in 1938 and were regularly used by Winston Churchill during World War II. However, the Cabinet War Rooms were vulnerable to a direct hit and were abandoned not long after the war. The Cabinet War Rooms were a secret to all civilians until their opening to the public in 1984. They are now a popular tourist attraction maintained by the Imperial War Museum.

The section of the War Rooms open to the public is in fact only a portion of a much larger facility. They originally covered three acres (1.2 hectares) and housed a staff of up to 528 people, with facilities including a canteen, hospital, shooting range and dormitories. The centrepiece of the War Rooms is the Cabinet Room itself, where Churchill's War Cabinet met.

The Map Room is adjacent, from where the course of the war was directed. It is still in much the same condition as when it was abandoned, with the original maps still on the walls and telephones and other original artefacts on the desks. Churchill slept in a small bedroom nearby. There is a small telephone room (disguised as a toilet) down the corridor that provided a direct line to the White House in Washington DC, via a special scrambler in an annexe basement of Selfridges department store in Oxford Street.

Q-Whitehall
Q-Whitehall is the name given to a communications facility under Whitehall.

The facility was built in a 12 ft (3.7 m) diameter tunnel during World War II, and extends under Whitehall. A similar facility was constructed in a tunnel that ran parallel to the Aldwych branch of the Piccadilly Line and was known as Trunks Kingsway (Kingsway Telephone Exchange). The project was known as 'Post Office scheme 2845'. A detailed description, with photographs, was published just after the war in the January 1946 edition of The Post Office Electrical Engineers' Journal.

Sites equipped with unusual amounts of GPO/BT telecommunications plant are given a BT site engineering code. This site's code was L/QWHI.

The site provided protected accommodation for the lines and terminal equipment serving the most important government departments, civil and military, to ensure the command and control of the war could continue despite heavy bombing of London.

At the northern end, a tunnel connects to a shaft up to the former Trafalgar Square tube station (now merged with Charing Cross station), and to the BT deep level cable tunnels which were built under much of London during the Cold War. At the southern end, an 8 ft (2.4 m) diameter extension (Scheme 2845A) connects to a shaft under Court 6 of the Treasury Building: this provided the protected route from the Cabinet War Room. This was known as Y-Whitehall. The  tunnel was further extended (Scheme 2845B) to the Marsham Street Rotundas. This extension housed the 'Federal' telephone exchange which had a dialling code of 333 from the public network. In the 1980s it housed Horseferry Tandem which provided a unified communications system for all government departments as well as the Palace of Westminster.

Access to the tunnel is gained via an 8 ft (2.4 m) lateral tunnel and a lift shaft in the nearby Whitehall telephone exchange in Craig's Court. A further entrance is via the deep level portion of the Admiralty.

Spur tunnels, 5 ft (1.5 m) in diameter, were built to provide protected cable routes to the major service buildings either side of Whitehall.

The Whitehall tunnels appear to have been extended in the early 1950s. Some official documents refer to a Scheme 3245: this is the only numbered tunnel scheme that has never been officially revealed or located by researchers. Files in the National Archives which may relate to this have been closed for 75 years and will not be opened until the 2020s.

The journalist Duncan Campbell managed to get into the BT deep level cable tunnels below London, and described his adventure in a New Statesman article in 1980. He found a (closed) entrance to Q-Whitehall below Trafalgar Square, and created a number of tunnel maps based on his investigation.

See also
 Fortifications of London
 Central Government War Headquarters
 Subterranean London
 Civil defence centres in London
 Paddock (war rooms)

References

External links
 Churchill War Rooms on the Imperial War Museum website

Infrastructure in London
Local government in London
Subterranean London
Buildings and structures in the City of Westminster
Military installations of the United Kingdom
Fortifications of London
United Kingdom nuclear command and control
Military command and control installations